National champion may refer to:

 The winner of a national championship in sports or other contests
 National champions are large companies dominant in their fields and favoured by the governments of the countries in which they are based
 National Champions (film), an American sports drama film starring Stephan James and J. K. Simmons